Oligodranes is a genus of bee flies in the family Bombyliidae, the sole genus of the subfamily Oligodraninae.

Species
These three species belong to the genus Oligodranes:
 Oligodranes flavus Paramonov, 1929 c g
 Oligodranes israeliensis Zaitzev, 1966 c g
 Oligodranes obscuripennis Loew, 1844 c g
Data sources: i = ITIS, c = Catalogue of Life, g = GBIF, b = Bugguide.net

References

Bombyliidae